Vice-Admiral Glenn Victor Davidson  (born 1952) is a retired senior naval officer who served in the Canadian Forces.

Military career 
Davidson joined the Naval Reserve in 1970 and transferred to the regular force in 1974 after completing his studies at the University of King's College in Halifax. Specialising in navigation and air control, Davidson saw service in the Atlantic Ocean|Atlantic and Pacific Oceans, as well as undertaking various staff and headquarters appointments before taking command of HMCS Kootenay (DDE 258) in 1989.

Davidson remained in command of Kootenay until 1991. After a posting to the Canadian Embassy in Tokyo, Japan as defence attache from 1992 to 1995 he was appointed Commander of Maritime Operations Group Two in the Pacific, which included seven frigates and destroyers and an operational support ship. In 1997 he was promoted to commodore and took up the post of Direct General Naval Personnel in Ottawa. He was promoted to rear admiral in 2000 and became Chief of Staff Human Resources Military. In both positions he was deeply involved in military quality of life, recruiting, retention, military health and veterans' care issues. He was appointed Commander of the Order of Military Merit in 2002.

Between 2002 and 2004 Davidson commanded Maritime Forces Atlantic, which encompassed some 10,000 sea-going and shore-based naval and civilian personnel. He was named citizen of the year by the Halifax Chamber of Commerce in 2003 and received the DM/CDS innovation award for his personal launch of the civilian workforce renewal initiative in 2004. In 2004 he was appointed the Canadian Military Representative to the NATO Military Committee in NATO Headquarters Brussels. He held this post until 2008.

Diplomatic career 
From September 2008 to March 2012, Davidson served as Ambassador of Canada to the Syrian Arab Republic, a period which included Syria's descent into civil war. He closed the Canadian Embassy in Damascus in March 2012. In May 2012 he was appointed as Ambassador of Canada to the Islamic Republic of Afghanistan and remained in that position until July 2013 when he returned to Canada.

Awards and decorations 
Davidson's personal awards and decorations include the following:

Arms

References

External links 

1952 births
Living people
Canadian people of Ulster-Scottish descent
People from Truro, Nova Scotia
Royal Canadian Navy officers
Canadian admirals
Commanders of the Order of Military Merit (Canada)
Ambassadors of Canada to Syria
Ambassadors of Canada to Afghanistan
Canadian military personnel from Nova Scotia